Attila Kovács may refer to:
 Attila Kovács (athlete) (born 1960), Hungarian former sprinter
 Attila Kovács (fencer) (1939–2010), Hungarian fencer
 Attila Kovács (footballer, born 1981), Hungarian footballer for Ceglédi VSE
 Attila Kovacs (footballer, born 1956), Hungarian footballer